Shin Dong-yup (born February 17, 1971) is a South Korean comedian and television comedy show host. He graduated from the Seoul Institute of the Arts. He became popular after appearing in SBS's variety program Happy Saturday and MBC's sitcom Guys n Girls.

Filmography

Television shows

Web shows

Television series

Hosting

Awards and nominations

Listicles

Notes

References

External links 

Shin Dong-yeob at SM C&C
Sin Dong-yeop Fancafe at Daum 

South Korean television presenters
South Korean male television actors
South Korean comedians
SM Entertainment artists
1971 births
Living people
Best Variety Performer Male Paeksang Arts Award (television) winners